Lukas Watkowiak (born 6 March 1996) is a German professional footballer who plays as a goalkeeper for Swiss club St. Gallen.

Club career
On 20 August 2020, he signed a two-year contract with the Swiss club St. Gallen.

References

External links
 
 

1996 births
Living people
German footballers
Association football goalkeepers
1. FSV Mainz 05 II players
1. FSV Mainz 05 players
SV Wehen Wiesbaden players
FC St. Gallen players
3. Liga players
2. Bundesliga players
Swiss Super League players
German expatriate footballers
German expatriate sportspeople in Switzerland
Expatriate footballers in Switzerland